XHTXA-FM is a Mexican radio station in Tuxpan, Veracruz. It is owned by Grupo FM and is known as Soy FM 93.9.

History
XHTXA's concession was awarded in 1994 to María del Carmen Jiménez y Betancourt. The station was sold in 1999.

References

Radio stations in Veracruz
Radio stations established in 1994
1994 establishments in Mexico